Kuntur Sayana (Quechua kuntur condor, sayana stop, whereabouts, a place where you stop frequently, "condor stop", Hispanicized spelling Condor Sayana) is a mountain in the Arequipa Region in the Andes of Peru, about  high. It is situated in the La Unión Province, Tomepampa District, and in the Condesuyos Province, Salamanca District, west of the mountains Phirura (Firura) and Sunqu Urqu and east of the mountain Saraqutu.

References 

Mountains of Peru
Mountains of Arequipa Region